was a town in Satsuma District, Kagoshima Prefecture, Japan.

As of 2003, the town had an estimated population of 17,346 and the density of 118.85 persons per km². The total area was 145.95 km².

On March 22, 2005, Miyanojō, along with the town of Tsuruda (also from Satsuma District), was merged into the expanded town of Satsuma (former name: 薩摩町; current name: さつま町) and no longer exists as an independent municipality.

It was also sometimes known at "take no furusato" or the hometown of bamboo.

External links
 Official website of Satsuma 

Dissolved municipalities of Kagoshima Prefecture